Allen J. Miller is an American baseball coach and former catcher, who is the current head baseball coach of the Lafayette Leopards. He played college baseball at Lafayette before playing professionally from 2011 to 2012.

Coaching career
On August 24, 2022, Miller was hired as the head baseball coach of the Lafayette Leopards.

Head coaching record

References

External links

Lafayette Leopards bio

Living people
Lafayette Leopards baseball coaches
Lafayette Leopards baseball players
Lehigh Mountain Hawks baseball coaches
Lincoln Saltdogs players
Normal CornBelters players
1989 births